Eupithecia supersophia is a moth in the family Geometridae. It is found in Nepal.

References

Moths described in 1987
supersophia
Moths of Asia